The group stage of the 2000 CAF Champions League was played from 22 July to 12 November 2000. A total of eight teams competed in the group stage.

Format
In the group stage, each group was played on a home-and-away round-robin basis. The winners of each group advanced directly to the final.

Groups
The matchdays were 22–23 July, 4–7 August, 19–20 August, 13–15 September, 27 October–4 November, and 11–12 November 2000.

Group A

Group B

References

External links
2000 CAF Champions League - todor66.com

Group stage